Murray Paul Watkinson (11 June 1939 – 19 January 2004) was a New Zealand rower. He competed at the 1964 and 1972 Summer Olympics in the single sculls and placed fifth and tenth, respectively. He won a European bronze medal in this event in 1971.

Watkinson was born in 1939. He started training at the West End Rowing Club in 1953 when he was 13 years old. He won his first major title, a silver medal in the double sculls, at the 1962 British Empire and Commonwealth Games, partnering with his brother Peter. At the 1964 European Rowing Championships in Amsterdam, he came fourth in the single sculls. Two months later at the 1964 Summer Olympics in Tokyo, he came fifth. Watkinson competed as one of the favourites in single sculls at the 1967 European Rowing Championships in Vichy, France, but did not reach the final.

Watkinson's health declined during his later years. He was one of the few New Zealanders to have received a heart-liver transplant. He died in 2004.

References

1939 births
2004 deaths
New Zealand male rowers
Rowers at the 1962 British Empire and Commonwealth Games
Commonwealth Games silver medallists for New Zealand
Rowers at the 1964 Summer Olympics
Rowers at the 1972 Summer Olympics
Olympic rowers of New Zealand
World Rowing Championships medalists for New Zealand
Commonwealth Games medallists in rowing
European Rowing Championships medalists
Medallists at the 1962 British Empire and Commonwealth Games